Heemraadlaan is one of three (above-ground) subway stations in the Dutch city of Spijkenisse. The station is the penultimate stop for trains of Rotterdam Metro lines C and D and features two side platforms. The station is named for the large thoroughfare above which it is built.

The station was opened on 25 April 1985. On that date, the North-South Line (currently operated by line D trains) was extended from its former terminus, Zalmplaat station, towards its current terminus, De Akkers station. Since the East-West Line was connected to the North-South Line in November 2002, trains of what is currently line C also call at the station.

Rotterdam Metro stations
Nissewaard
Railway stations opened in 1985
1985 establishments in the Netherlands
Railway stations in the Netherlands opened in the 20th century